Tatarstan Airlines operated flights to the following (as of January 2017):

Africa
Egypt
Hurghada - Hurghada Airport [charter]
Sharm el-Sheikh - Sharm el-Sheikh Airport [charter]
Taba - Taba Airport [charter]

Asia

Central Asia

Tajikistan
Dushanbe - Dushanbe Airport
Khujand - Khujand Airport
Uzbekistan
Tashkent - Yuzhniy Airport

Western Asia
Armenia
Yerevan - Zvartnots Airport
Azerbaijan
Baku - Heydar Aliyev Airport
Israel
Tel Aviv - Ben Gurion Airport
United Arab Emirates
Dubai - Dubai Airport [charter]

Europe
Bulgaria
Burgas - Sarafovo Airport [charter]
Varna - Varna Airport [charter]
Croatia
Pula - Pula Airport [charter]
Cyprus
Paphos - Paphos International Airport [charter]
Czech Republic
Prague - Václav Havel Airport Prague
Greece
Heraklion - Nikos Kazantzakis Airport [charter]
Thessaloniki - Makedonia Airport [charter]
Hungary
Debrecen - Debrecen Airport [charter]
Sármellék - Sármellék International Airport [charter]
Russia
Chelyabinsk - Balandino Airport
Kazan - Kazan Airport (Hub)
Kemerovo - Kemerovo International Airport
Krasnodar - Pashkovsky Airport
Moscow - Domodedovo Airport
Nizhnekamsk - Begishevo Airport (Secondary hub)
Nizhnevartovsk - Nizhnevartovsk Airport
Nizhny Novgorod - Strigino Airport
Novosibirsk - Tolmachevo Airport
Perm - Bolshoye Savino Airport
Saint Petersburg - Pulkovo Airport
Sochi - Sochi Airport
Yekaterinburg - Koltsovo Airport
Spain
Barcelona - El Prat Airport [charter]
Turkey
Istanbul - Istanbul Airport
Ukraine
Kyiv - Boryspil Airport
Simferopol - Simferopol Airport

References

Lists of airline destinations